Mom Thinks I'm Crazy to Marry a Japanese Guy (Mandarin: 雖然媽媽說我不可以嫁去日本) is a 2017 romantic-comedy film directed by Akihisa Yachida. Based upon a non-fiction book by Mr. and Mrs. Mogi, the film is a co-production between Japan and Taiwan, and stars Jian Man-shu and Yuta Nakano. The film was theatrically released on May 27, 2017 in Japan and in Taiwan on June 16, 2017.

Synopsis
Yi-han is a Taiwanese girl who not only has a love for Japanese culture, but also majors the language in college. One day, Yi-han receives a Facebook message from a Japanese guy named Mogi. From then on the pair begin to interact through Facebook. During a holiday trip to Taiwan, Mogi finally met Yi-han for the first time, where time seems to pass even more quickly when they are together. Over time, with the frequent exchanges of messages, they begin to develop mutual feelings for each other, but can they make things work despite the circumstances?

Cast
Jian Man-shu as Lin Yi-han
Yuta Nakano as Mogi
Lotus Wang as Lin's mother
Lin Mei-hsiu as Akemi
Yoshikazu Ebisu as Mogi's father
Mondo Ōtani as Mogi's friend
Takashi Okamoto as Mogi's friend
Fion Sun as Ching-lan 
Eriku Yoza
Don Li
Sean Lin

Soundtrack

Featured songs

References

External links
 
 

2017 films
2010s Japanese-language films
Taiwanese-language films
Taiwanese romantic comedy films
Japanese romantic comedy films
2017 romantic comedy films
Films about interracial romance
Films based on non-fiction books
2017 directorial debut films
Japanese multilingual films
Taiwanese multilingual films
2017 multilingual films
2010s Mandarin-language films
2010s Japanese films